Hans Merensky Wilderness, also known as the Hans Merensky Nature Reserve, is a protected area in Limpopo Province, South Africa. It has an area of about 5,268 ha and lies in the Lowveld between the Kruger Park and the town of Tzaneen. It is located on the banks of the Great Letaba River, a tributary of the Olifants River.

The Reserve is named after Hans Merensky, a South African geologist and conservationist. There is an ethnographic museum, the Tsonga Kraal Museum, displaying the culture of the Tsonga people.

Wildlife 
Wildlife in the area include Selous' zebra, blue wildebeest, warthog and South African giraffe, as well as the more elusive nocturnal animals like African leopard, black-backed jackal and spotted hyena.

See also
Protected areas of South Africa

References

External links
 Hans Merensky Nature Reserve

Protected areas of Limpopo
Nature conservation in South Africa